"Family" is the second episode of the second season of Masters of Horror. It originally aired in North America on November 3, 2006. The DVD was released on April 17, 2007. It is the fifteenth episode and the sixteenth episode to be released on DVD.

Plot
A young married couple, Celia (Meredith Monroe) and David (Matt Keeslar), move into a new home and meet their seemingly venerable neighbor Harold (George Wendt). Harold is in fact a psychotic serial killer who has created a family using the skeletons of his former victims, which he has kidnapped and murdered throughout the years.

His family consists of a wife and a daughter, and later a father and a mother, all of whom Harold seems to believe are fully alive. He dresses them in clothing, moves them around the house, and talks with them as if they can talk back. He also hallucinates that a teenage girl was asking him to kill her so his "daughter" could have a sister, and at dinner, he hears Celia express a desire to have rough sex right there on the table. There is also the hint that he replaces family members when he finds a new victim.

Celia and David, however, have a secret of their own: years ago, Harold killed their daughter, and they have been tracking him down ever since. They lure him into a trap and exact their revenge. David says they can torture him 10 to 14 more days, and Harold's frightened reaction appears behind the end credits.

Music
The gospel music that plays in the intro is "Jesus Gave Me Water" and "Friends, Let Me Tell You About Jesus", sung by The Dixieaires.

External links
 
 Podcasters Of Horror on The Super Network

2006 American television episodes
Masters of Horror episodes

ru:Семья (эпизод Мастеров ужаса)